Porte de Pantin (Parc de la Villette) is a station of the Paris Métro, serving Line 5. The name refers to the Avenue de la Porte de Pantin, on the edge of Paris leading to the town of Pantin.

Location
The station is located under Avenue Jean-Jaurès not far from the Porte de Pantin.

History
The station was opened on 12 October 1942 during the extension of the line to the Église de Pantin station. It owes its name to a gate in the old fortifications, on the road to Germany (the current avenue Jean-Jaurès), which took the name of the commune. It is subtitled Parc de la Villette, the name of the park located north of the station.

It saw 5,377,661 travelers enter the metro station in 2018, which places it at the 77th position for its attendance.

Passenger services

Station layout

Platforms
The station has a special layout because it was designed to serve as a terminus for some services. It comprises three tracks and two platforms, the south side platform being lateral and the north side platform forming an island between two tracks. The central lane, not used in commercial service, serves as a depot.

The elliptical vault is painted white, while the walls are covered with white and grey flat tiles, decorated with red, blue, green, orange, and yellow musical notes. The name of the station is written in faience on the abutments of the station and with the Parisine font on enamelled plates on the central platform.

Bus services
The station is served by lines 75 and 151 of the RATP Bus Network and, at night, by lines N13, N41 and N45 of the Noctilien night bus network.

The station has also a connection with Line 3b of the Tramways d'Île-de-France since 15 December 2012, the day of its commissioning.

Gallery

References

Roland, Gérard (2003). Stations de métro. D'Abbesses à Wagram. Éditions Bonneton.

Paris Métro stations in the 19th arrondissement of Paris
Railway stations in France opened in 1942